Alberto Redondo Guijarro (born 22 May 1997) is a Spanish footballer who plays for Elche CF Ilicitano as a right back.

Club career
Born in Cuenca, Castile-La Mancha, Redondo finished his formation with Getafe CF. On 1 November 2015 he his senior debut with the reserves, starting in a 2–0 Segunda División B home win against Real Madrid Castilla.

Redondo appeared in two further matches during the campaign, as his side suffered relegation. He scored his first senior goal on 5 February 2017, netting the opener in a 4–0 home routing of SR Villaverde-Boetticher CF.

Redondo made his first team – and La Liga – debut on 6 May 2018, starting in a 1–0 away win against UD Las Palmas. However, he resumed his spell with the B-team before leaving in 2019.

In January 2020, Redondo moved to another reserve team, RCD Mallorca B also in the fourth division.

References

External links

1997 births
Living people
People from Cuenca, Spain
Sportspeople from the Province of Cuenca
Spanish footballers
Footballers from Castilla–La Mancha
Association football defenders
La Liga players
Segunda División B players
Tercera División players
Getafe CF B players
Getafe CF footballers
RCD Mallorca B players
Elche CF Ilicitano footballers